The 1971 NASCAR Winston West Series was the 18th season of the series. The title was eventually won by Ray Elder, his third in succession.

Schedule and results
The 1971 season included 26 individual races, although some tracks were run twice.

† This race was not given a name.

See also
1971 NASCAR Winston Cup Series

ARCA Menards Series West
Winston West